often stylized in capital letters as FREEDOMS is a Japanese professional wrestling promotion based in Chigasaki, Kanagawa. Founded by Takashi Sasaki in 2009, the promotion lets wrestlers choose their own fighting style, having the "freedom" of choice.

History
Following the closure of Apache Pro-Wrestling Army (Apache Pro) on August 8, 2009, Takashi Sasaki announced the creation of Pro Wrestling Freedoms (Freedoms) with Gentaro, Jun Kasai, Kumai, Mammoth Sasaki and The Winger.

Over the years, Freedoms has become one of Japan's premiere deathmatch companies, alongside Big Japan Pro Wrestling. They formed an alliance with the American promotion Game Changer Wrestling that has seen both companies trade stars and co-promote events together. Some of Freedoms' top stars include deathmatch legends Jun Kasai, Masashi Takeda, Toru Sugiura, and Daisuke Masaoka. In 2018, Game Changer Wrestling (GCW) initiated "The Collective", a series of showcases from partnering indie promotions. So, Freedoms held their first-ever event in the United States in April 2020.

It is the latest promotion to jump to Independent Wrestling TV (IWTV), following recent partnerships with GCW, Sendai Girls' Pro Wrestling, Defy Wrestling, Combat Zone Wrestling, Absolute Intense Wrestling, and more.

The promotion held most of their events in various venues such as Korakuen Hall and Tokyo Dome.

Freedoms began a brief partnership with Active Advance Pro Wrestling, starting promoting a series of shows beginning with FREEDOMS/2AW Versus from December 13, 2020.

Roster
This is a list of professional wrestlers who currently wrestle for the company. Alumni and notable guest superstars are also included.

Active

Alumni/notable guests

Black Buffalo
Brahman Kei
Brahman Shu
Dai Suzuki
Gami
Great Kojika
Hayata
Hikari Shimizu
Kagetsu
Kaji Tomato
Kenichiro Arai
Kuuga
Minoru Fujita
Mochi Miyagi
Rina Yamashita
Takoyakida
The Winger
Yoshihisa Uto

Championships

King of Freedom World Tag Team Championship 

The King of Freedom World Tag Team Championship is a tag team title created and promoted by Pro Wrestling Freedoms. There have been a total of nineteen reigns and one vacancy shared between eighteen different teams consisting of thirty-three distinctive wrestlers. The current champions are Mammoth Sasaki and Takashi Sasaki who are in their first reign as a team.

Combined reigns 

{| class="wikitable sortable" style="text-align: center"
!Rank
!Wrestler
!No. ofreigns
!Combineddefenses
!Combineddays
|-
!1
| Mammoth Sasaki and Violento Jack || 1 || 11 || 754
|-
!2
| Mammoth Sasaki and Toru Sugiura || 1 || 11 || 427
|-
!3
| Soul Meat || 1 || 9 || 374
|-
!4
| Gentaro and The Winger || 1 || 4 || 294
|-
!5
| Daisuke Masaoka and Violento Jack || 2 || 2 || 215
|-
!6
| ERE || 1 || 2 || 212
|-
!7
| Great Kojika and The Winger || 1 || 3 || 194
|-
!8
| Hayata and Yuya Susumu || 1 || 4 || 157
|-
!9
| Unchain || 1 || 3 || 128
|-
!10
| Unchain || 1 || 1 || 107
|-
!11
| Daisuke Masaoka and Kamui || 1 || 3 || 102
|-
!12
| Kamui and Mammoth Sasaki || 1 || 4 || 86
|-
!13
|style="background-color:#FFE6BD"| Mammoth Sasaki and Takashi Sasaki † || 1 || 2 || +
|-
!14
| The Brahman Brothers/El Hijo del Winger Dos and El Hijo del Winger Uno || 2 || 1 || 67
|-
!15
| Black Buffalo and Susumu || 1 || 1 || 39
|-
!rowspan=2|16
| Gentaro and Kenichiro Arai || 1 || 0 || 18
|-
| Unchain || 1 || 0 || 18
|-
!18
| Gentaro and Takashi Sasaki || 1 || 0 || 3
|-

By wrestler 

{| class="wikitable sortable" style="text-align: center"
!Rank
!Wrestler
!No. ofreigns
!Combineddefenses
!Combineddays
|-
!1
|style="background-color:#FFE6BD"| Mammoth Sasaki † || 4 || 28 || +
|-
!2
| Violento Jack || 3 || 13 || 983
|-
!3
| Toru Sugiura || 2 || 20 || 801
|-
!4
| Tomoya Hirata || 1 || 9 || 374
|-
!5
| Daisuke Masaoka || 3 || 5 || 331
|-
!6
| Gentaro || 3 || 4 || 315
|-
!rowspan=2|7
| Takayuki Ueki || 1 || 2 || 212
|-
| Toshiyuki Sakuda || 1 || 2 || 212
|-
!9
| Yuya Susumu/Susumu || 2 || 5 || 196
|-
!rowspan=2|10
| Great Kojika || 1 || 3 || 194
|-
| The Winger || 1 || 3 || 194
|-
!12
| Kamui || 2 || 7 || 188
|-
!13
| Hayata || 1 || 4 || 157
|-
!rowspan=2|14
| Jun Kasai || 1 || 3 || 128
|-
| Masashi Takeda || 1 || 3 || 128
|-
!16
| Minoru Fujita || 2 || 2 || 125
|-
!17
| Rina Yamashita || 1 || 1 || 107
|-
!18
|style="background-color:#FFE6BD"| Takashi Sasaki † || 2 || 2 || +
|-
!rowspan=2|19
| Brahman Kei/El Hijo del Winger Dos || 2 || 1 || 67
|-
| Brahman Shu/El Hijo del Winger Uno || 2 || 1 || 67
|-
!21
| Black Buffalo || 1 || 1 || 39
|-
!rowspan=2|22
| Kenji Fukimoto || 1 || 0 || 18
|-
| Kenichiro Arai || 1 || 0 || 18
|-

See also
Professional wrestling in Japan
List of professional wrestling promotions in Japan

Notes

References

External links

Twitter FREEDOMS

2009 establishments in Japan
Entertainment companies established in 2009
Professional wrestling promotions